is a private university in Tomakomai, Hokkaido, Japan, established in 1998. The predecessor of the school was founded in 1965.

External links
 Official website 

Educational institutions established in 1965
Private universities and colleges in Japan
Universities and colleges in Hokkaido
Komazawa University
1965 establishments in Japan